This article details how the names of the streets in Crawley and Nedlands, Western Australia evolved along with the variations in use. The streets are within the City of Perth boundaries, which was amended in 2016 to include the University of Western Australia and Kings Park.

See also 
 List of streets in Perth
 List of streets in East Perth
 List of streets and paths in Kings Park
 List of streets in West Perth
 List of streets in Bayswater, Western Australia
List of streets in Kardinya, Western Australia

Notes

Crawley and Nedlands
 
Crawley and Nedlands streets
Crawley and Nedlands streets
Crawley and Nedlands